Jesús Fernández Vaquero (16 August 1953 – 24 March 2021) was a Spanish school teacher and politician. He was a member of the Cortes of Castilla–La Mancha from 1999 to 2019, and served as the president of that legislative body from 2015 to 2019.

Vaquero was born in Turleque in the Province of Toledo, Castilla–La Mancha. He died on 24 March 2021.

He was Senator appointed by the Cortes from 2019 until his death.

References

1953 births
2021 deaths
People from the Province of Toledo
Spanish Socialist Workers' Party politicians
Members of the 5th Cortes of Castilla–La Mancha
Members of the 6th Cortes of Castilla–La Mancha
Members of the 7th Cortes of Castilla–La Mancha
Members of the 8th Cortes of Castilla–La Mancha
Members of the 9th Cortes of Castilla–La Mancha
Members of the Cortes of Castilla–La Mancha from Toledo
Members of the 13th Senate of Spain
Members of the 14th Senate of Spain